Larry Hennessy (May 20, 1929 – August 20, 2008) was an American basketball player.

Hennessy, a 6' 4" forward out of Blessed Sacrament High School in New Rochelle, New York, played college basketball for Villanova University.  An excellent passer and rebounder, Hennessy finished his collegiate career with 1737 points.  He was named to the 1951–52 sophomore All-America first team.

Hennessy played professionally in the  NBA for the Philadelphia Warriors in 1955–56, and for the Syracuse Nationals in 1956–57.

References

1929 births
2008 deaths
All-American college men's basketball players
Allentown Jets players
American men's basketball players
Basketball players from New York (state)
High school basketball coaches in the United States
Philadelphia Warriors draft picks
Philadelphia Warriors players
Shooting guards
Small forwards
Sportspeople from New Rochelle, New York
Syracuse Nationals players
Villanova Wildcats men's basketball players
Wilkes-Barre Barons players
Eastern Basketball Association coaches